Todd Ousley is an American prelate of the Episcopal Church who is the current bishop for the Office of Pastoral Development. Between 2006 and 2017, he also served as the second bishop of Eastern Michigan.

Biography 
Ousley was born in Waco, Texas, and studied at Texas A&M University between 1979 and 1981 and again in 1984 when he earned a Master of Arts. He also graduated from Baylor University in 1983. He graduated with a Master of Divinity from the Episcopal Theological Seminary of the Southwest in 1991, and a Doctor of Ministry in congregational development from Seabury-Western Theological Seminary in 2004.

He was ordained to the priesthood on February 1, 1992. He served as curate at the Church of the Good Shepherd in Austin, Texas between 1991 and 1993. He then became rector of the Church of the Holy Comforter in Angleton, Texas in 1993, while in 1997, he became rector of St Francis' Church in Temple, Texas. In 2001 he became canon to the ordinary at Episcopal Diocese of Eastern Michigan.

On May 6, 2006, Ousley was elected Coadjutor Bishop of Eastern Michigan and was consecrated as a bishop on September 9, 2006. He resigned his post in 2017 after he was named Bishop for the Office of Pastoral Development.

See also
 List of Episcopal bishops of the United States
 Historical list of the Episcopal bishops of the United States

References

Living people
Year of birth missing (living people)
Texas A&M University alumni
Baylor University alumni
Seminary of the Southwest alumni
Seabury-Western Theological Seminary alumni
Episcopal bishops of Eastern Michigan